Roberto Aguirre (born 10 February 1942) is an Argentine former professional footballer.

Club career
Aguirre started his playing career in Argentina with Quilmes where he played 130 games between 1960 and 1965. He also played for Banfield, Newell's Old Boys and Racing Club, before moving to the United States in 1972, where he played in the NASL between 1972 and 1978 for the Miami Gatos, Miami Toros and Fort Lauderdale Strikers.

International career
Aguirre played 8 times for the Argentina national team between 1968 and 1969.

References

1942 births
Living people
Footballers from Buenos Aires
Argentina international footballers
Argentine expatriate footballers
Argentine footballers
Argentine expatriate sportspeople in the United States
Club Atlético Banfield footballers
Expatriate soccer players in the United States
Association football defenders
Association football midfielders
Fort Lauderdale Strikers (1977–1983) players
Miami Toros players
Newell's Old Boys footballers
Argentine Primera División players
North American Soccer League (1968–1984) players
North American Soccer League (1968–1984) indoor players
Quilmes Atlético Club footballers
Racing Club de Avellaneda footballers